(d)CMP kinase (prokaryotic cytidylate kinase, deoxycytidylate kinase, dCMP kinase, deoxycytidine monophosphokinase) is an enzyme with systematic name ATP:(d)CMP phosphotransferase. This enzyme catalyses the following chemical reaction

 ATP + (d)CMP  ADP + (d)CDP

The prokaryotic cytidine monophosphate kinase specifically phosphorylates CMP (or dCMP).

References

External links 
 

EC 2.7.4